Julie Fairey is a New Zealand politician who is an Auckland Councillor. In 2022, Fairey was elected as one of two councillors representing the Albert-Eden-Puketāpapa ward.

Early life
Before becoming a local board member, Fairey worked in early childhood education, and was active among education unions.

Political career

Fairey ran unsuccessfully as the Alliance candidate for Epsom in 2002. She ran as a list candidate in 2005.

Fairey was elected to the Puketāpapa Local Board in the 2010 Auckland local board elections. She served as the chair of the board from 2013 to 2016, and as the deputy chair for the first half of the 2019–2022 term.

In the 2022 local body elections, Fairey was elected as one of two councillors for the Albert-Eden-Puketāpapa ward. She took office on 16 October 2022.

Personal life 

Fairey's spouse is Mount Roskill MP Michael Wood. Both ran campaigns as electorate MPs in 2002, and together were elected to the Puketāpapa Local Board in 2010.

References

Alliance (New Zealand political party) politicians
Auckland Councillors
Living people
New Zealand Labour Party politicians
Unsuccessful candidates in the 2002 New Zealand general election
Unsuccessful candidates in the 2005 New Zealand general election
Year of birth missing (living people)
21st-century New Zealand women politicians